Acria javanica is a moth in the family Depressariidae. It was described by Alexandr L. Lvovsky in 2015. It is found on the Indonesian islands of Sumba and Java.

References

Moths described in 2015
Acria